Kenner Gutiérrez Cerdas (born 9 June 1989) is a Costa Rican professional footballer who plays for Liga Nacional club Xelajú.

Career
He played for Costa Rica at the 2017 Copa Centroamericana and the 2017 CONCACAF Gold Cup. He was named among the standby players for the 2018 FIFA World Cup and was later called up to replace the injured Rónald Matarrita.

On July 1, 2020, after Liga Deportiva Alajuelense failed to win the league for the 13th consecutive time, it was announced that Gutiérrez would not have his contract renewed, after pressure from fans demanding the team let go of long-time players to make room for new ones.

Career statistics

International

References

External links

1989 births
Living people
Association football defenders
Costa Rican footballers
Costa Rica international footballers
2017 Copa Centroamericana players
2017 CONCACAF Gold Cup players
2018 FIFA World Cup players
L.D. Alajuelense footballers
Liga FPD players
2009 CONCACAF U-20 Championship players